Taichung Blue Whale is a Taiwanese women's football club based in Taichung. Founded in 2014, it is associated with National Taiwan University of Sport. The team currently competes in the country's top-tier women's domestic competition, the Taiwan Mulan Football League.

Honours
Taiwan Mulan Football League
Champions (4): 2017, 2018, 2019, 2021

Players

Current squad

NTUS Taichung Blue Whale

Personnel

Executives 

   Chang Wen-Ting

Coaches

NTUS Taichung Blue Whale Coaches and Staffs

References

External links

Association football clubs established in 2014
Women's football clubs in Taiwan
Sport in Taichung
2014 establishments in Taiwan
Taiwan Mulan Football League